Caliban  is the second-largest retrograde irregular satellite of Uranus. It was discovered on 6 September 1997 by Brett J. Gladman, Philip D. Nicholson, Joseph A. Burns, and John J. Kavelaars using the 200-inch Hale telescope together with Sycorax and given the temporary designation S/1997 U 1.

Designated Uranus XVI, it was named after the monster character in William Shakespeare's play The Tempest.

Orbit 

Caliban follows a distant orbit, more than 10 times further from Uranus than the furthest regular moon Oberon. Its orbit is retrograde, moderately inclined and slightly eccentric. The orbital parameters suggest that it may belong to the same dynamic cluster as Stephano and Francisco, suggesting common origin.

The diagram illustrates the orbital parameters of the retrograde irregular satellites of Uranus (in polar co-ordinates) with the eccentricity of the orbits represented by the segments extending from the pericentre to the apocentre.

Physical characteristics 
Caliban's diameter is estimated to be around 42 km, based on thermal measurements by the Herschel Space Observatory. Its albedo is estimated at around 0.22, which is unusually high compared to those of other Uranian irregular satellites. Neptune's largest irregular satellite, Nereid, has a similarly high albedo as Caliban.

Somewhat inconsistent reports put Caliban in light-red category, redder than Himalia but still less red than most Kuiper belt objects. Caliban may be slightly redder than Sycorax. It also absorbs light at 0.7 μm, and one group of astronomers think this may be a result of liquid water that modified the surface.

Measurements of Caliban's light curve by the Kepler space telescope indicate that its rotation period is about 9.9 hours.

Origin 

Caliban is hypothesized to be a captured object: it did not form in the accretionary disk that existed around Uranus just after its formation. The exact capture mechanism is not known, but capturing a moon requires the dissipation of energy. The possible capture processes include: gas drag in the protoplanetary disk, many body interactions and the capture during the fast growth of the Uranus' mass (so-called "pull-down").

See also 

 Moons of Uranus

References

External links 
 Caliban Profile by NASA's Solar System Exploration
 David Jewiit pages
 Uranus' Known Satellites (by Scott S. Sheppard)
 MPC: Natural Satellites Ephemeris Service
 Caliban and Sycorax, Moons of Uranus (2005 Calvin J. Hamilton)

Moons of Uranus
Irregular satellites
19970906
Moons with a retrograde orbit